Tabulaephorus marptys is a moth of the family Pterophoridae. It is found in Russia, Kazakhstan and Mongolia.

Adults are on wing from May to September.

References

Moths described in 1872
Pterophorini